23 High Petergate is a grade I listed building in the city centre of York, in England.

The house lies on High Petergate, one of the main streets in York.  It was built in about 1779 at the end of a terrace, with a three-storey, four bay front of red brick, and side and back walls of orange brick.  Its external appearance is largely original, including the doorway, windows, and ground floor shutters.  The top of a drainpipe is inscribed "1780", while a similar one to the rear is marked "1779".  To the side of the front door is a torch extinguisher, made of iron.  The garden wall is also original.

A carriage house was added in the late 19th-century, and there were further alterations to the building in the 20th-century.  Inside the building, the main feature is an original staircase, rising through all the stories, with a serpentine balustrade, top lit by a glazed dome, surrounded by neoclassical plasterwork.   This staircase is described by Nikolaus Pevsner as "exceptional".

The building was grade I listed in 1954.

References

High Petergate 23
Houses completed in 1779
Houses in North Yorkshire
High Petergate 23